Club World London City was an executive all-business-class flight service between London City Airport and New York City marketed by British Airways. The service launched in September 2009 and operated until March 2020.

Service
BA began the service in September 2009, using two Airbus A318s fitted with 32 lie-flat beds in an all business class cabin. Flights operate under the numbers previously reserved for Concorde: BA001 – BA004. 

Until 2016, the service was operated twice-daily on weekdays between London City Airport and John F. Kennedy International Airport with one daily service operating at weekends. Due to the short runway at London City Airport limiting fuel uptake, westbound flights from London to New York made a stop at Shannon Airport for refueling, where passengers on board flight BA1 cleared US Customs and Immigration, arriving in New York as domestic passengers.

Although the fuel stop in Shannon led to a longer flight time compared to flights departing from Heathrow Airport to New York, passengers still saved time flying the London City service because they could check a bag just 20 minutes before departure compared to the 60 minutes required at Heathrow. The ability to clear US Customs and Immigration allowed passengers to save time after landing in New York; however, the introduction of Global Entry negated some of these time savings.

BA3, the second daily flight, enjoyed preclearance until 2012 when the US preclearance facility in Shannon shortened its operating hours. The flight was cancelled in 2016, leaving one daily service which preclears in Shannon. The service was suspended in March 2020 amidst COVID-19, before being officially cancelled in August 2020.

Operations

British Airways (BA) Limited was a British airline and a subsidiary of British Airways created in 2012 to operate the Club World London City service. The subsidiary was established as Acoperco Limited on 14 March 2012, which applied for operating and route licences with the Civil Aviation Authority the same month. British Airways transferred its two A318 aircraft to the certificate of the new subsidiary. The airline had codeshare agreements with American Airlines, Finnair, Iberia, and US Airways.

The Club World London City services returned to being operated directly by British Airways PLC in 2015 although no changes were made to the aircraft, crews or product offered.

Fleet
The service was operated using two Airbus A318-100 aircraft. Between 2012 and 2015, British Airways Limited operated the aircraft under a wet-lease arrangement with British Airways. After 2015, they were directly operated by the mainline British Airways, with no changes to the service offered. Each aircraft has 32 business class seats in a 2-2 configuration of eight rows which recline fully-flat. In-flight entertainment is provided via iPads distributed to passengers.

Titan Airways, a UK charter airline, acquired one of the A318s in 2017 to expand its operations after British Airways cancelled the second daily Club World London City service.

See also
 List of defunct airlines of the United Kingdom
 Qatar Airways Flights 15 and 16, an all-business-class flight operating from London Heathrow Airport

References 

Defunct airlines of the United Kingdom
Airlines established in 2012
Airlines disestablished in 2015
British Airways
Former Oneworld affiliate members
Airlines based in London
2009 establishments in England
2012 establishments in England
2015 disestablishments in England
2020 disestablishments in England
Business class airlines
British companies disestablished in 2015
British companies established in 2012
Commercial flights